Sneakers (translit. Kecove) is a 2011 Bulgarian adventure film directed by Valeri Yordanov. The film won a Special Mention at the 2011 Moscow International Film Festival. It was also selected as the Bulgarian entry for the Best Foreign Language Oscar at the 85th Academy Awards, but it did not make the final shortlist.

Plot 
The characters set off for a vacation at the seaside leaving their problems (family problems, relationship problems, trouble with the police) in the city (Sofia) behind. They meet at a remote beach at the Black Sea and form a band of young people spending time together living on the beach. The film describes their individual personalities, their philosophies and struggles with live and their relationship with the other characters in a hippiesque environment.

Cast
 Ivo Arakov as Wee
 Phillip Avramov as The Bird
 Ivan Barnev as Ivo
 Vasil Draganov as Fatso
 Iva Gocheva as The Barmaid
 Ina Nikolova as Emi
 Yana Titova as Polly
 Marian Valev as H
 Valeri Yordanov as Gray

See also
 List of submissions to the 85th Academy Awards for Best Foreign Language Film
 List of Bulgarian submissions for the Academy Award for Best Foreign Language Film

References

External links
 

2011 films
Bulgarian drama films
2010s Bulgarian-language films
2010s adventure films
2011 directorial debut films